The Jesus Lizard is an American rock band formed in 1987 in Austin, Texas and based in Chicago, Illinois.  They were "a leading noise rock band in the American independent underground…[who] turned out a series of independent records filled with scathing, disembowelling, guitar-driven pseudo-industrial noise, all of which received positive reviews in underground music publications and heavy college-radio play."

After a brief run as a recording-only project based in Austin, founding vocalist David Yow, bassist David Wm. Sims, and guitarist Duane Denison relocated to Chicago, Illinois, in 1989, where they found kindred spirits in recording engineer Steve Albini and Touch and Go Records.  With the addition of drummer Mac McNeilly, they began performing live, eventually attracting an international audience with their powerful live show. Drummer Jim Kimball replaced McNeilly late in 1996, and was himself replaced by Brendan Murphy two years later, with McNeilly returning to drums for their reunion shows years later.

Despite releasing a split single with leading alt-rockers Nirvana and signing to Capitol Records, the band failed to find commercial success amid the alternative rock explosion of the 1990s and disbanded in 1999. Their reunion tour ten years later garnered positive responses from audiences and critics. The band performed another reunion tour in 2017 and 2019.

History

Formation and Touch & Go years (1987–1994)
The band began in Austin, Texas, when guitarist Duane Denison asked David Yow, formerly of Scratch Acid, to play bass on some songs he wanted to record.  Yow suggested that he sing and have former Scratch Acid bassist David Wm. Sims play bass instead.  The resultant group took its name from a common nickname for the basilisk, a type of lizard that can run on water.  The trio rehearsed several times in Austin with a drum machine.  Yow and Sims moved to Chicago in 1988, and Denison followed the next year.

Their first EP, Pure, was recorded by Albini and released by Touch & Go in 1989.  It is the only record by the band that uses a drum machine.  Drummer Mac McNeilly, formerly of Phantom 309, was recruited and the band played its first live show on July 1, 1989.  Albini recorded the band's next four albums – Head, Goat, Liar, and Down.  During this era the group also released a live record, Show, and a split single with Nirvana, Puss/Oh, the Guilt.

Capitol years and breakup (1995–1999)

The band signed to Capitol Records in 1995, recording the song "Panic in Cicero" for the Clerks soundtrack and making appearances at Lollapalooza shortly thereafter. Impressed by his work on The Melvins' Stoner Witch album, the band hired producer Garth Richardson to record their next record, Shot, the following year.  While rumors that Albini refused to work with the band due to their involvement with a major label persisted, both Albini and the group have stated this to be false.

McNeilly left the band in late 1996, citing exhaustion from touring and the desire to spend more time with his family.  He was replaced by Jim Kimball, of Mule and Denison's side project, The Denison/Kimball Trio.

After more heavy touring the following year, this lineup recorded 1998's self-titled EP, their only record whose title is not a four-letter word, on Jetset Records. The EP featured production and engineering by Andy Gill of Gang of Four, John Cale, and Jim O'Rourke.  Later that year, the band released the album Blue, also recorded by Gill.  A departure, the record explored their experimental instincts previously hinted at on earlier songs like "Happy Bunny Goes Fluff-Fluff Along" and "White Hole".

In August 1998 Kimball left the group and was replaced by Chicago-based drummer Brendan Murphy, formerly of the Wesley Willis Fiasco. They embarked on several more months of heavy touring, playing the final gig of their initial career at the Umeå Open festival in Umeå, Sweden, on March 27, 1999.  After being dropped from Capitol Records mid-contract, the band announced its split the following June.

Post-breakup (2000–2007)
In 2000, Touch & Go issued Bang, a CD of 7" tracks and rarities. The members remained musically active: Denison began performing with Tomahawk, continued to play with Kimball in The Denison/Kimball Trio, and backed Hank Williams III on tour. In 2006, he also formed U.S.S.A. with bassist Paul Barker (ex-Ministry).  McNeilly played drums in P.W. Long's Reelfoot recording "Push Me Again",  and continued to play along with his wife in their band Mouse.  He recorded with Steve Albini in February 2007 for Denison's Fuzz label mate Greg Garing.

In 2006, Yow and Sims reformed Scratch Acid, along with original members Rey Washam (also of Rapeman, Ministry) and Brett Bradford (also of Sangre de Toro) for the Touch & Go Records 25th Anniversary Festival in Chicago. A week before the Touch & Go Festival, the reunited Scratch Acid played to a sold-out crowd at Emo's in their hometown of Austin.  Sims relocated to New York City, began working as an accountant, and maintained his solo project Dangerpuss. Denison relocated to Nashville. Yow moved to Los Angeles, working in graphic design for an advertising agency and joining the band Qui, before pursuing an acting career and briefly joining Flipper on vocals.

Reunion tour (2008–2010)
The Jesus Lizard reformed in 2008 with McNeilly drumming, and began playing concerts the next year. These shows included appearances at the Pitchfork Music Festival in Chicago, and All Tomorrow's Parties music festivals in England and New York.  On October 6, all of the band's Touch & Go studio albums were re-released with improved sound and bonus tracks.  The albums were remastered by Albini and Bob Weston and packaged with new liner notes and gatefold artwork.  Following the tour, the individual members returned to other projects and stated that this run of activity was "probably [their] last."

Post-reunion tour (2010–2016)
In August 2011 MVD released Club, a concert DVD and double LP of the band's Nashville performance at Exit/In from the 2009 tour.

In 2013, Yow released Tonight You Look Like a Spider, a solo album that had been in production for almost 15 years on Joyful Noise Recordings.  The album was released in a limited edition, where the vinyl album was delivered inside of a concrete monolith, instead of a normal record sleeve.  Yow stated that he'd been inspired to do the album by Mike Patton, and described his compositional process by stating,  "I rented a saxophone for 2 months, I borrowed some guitars and some drums, I rummaged through the kitchen, I squeezed a fat cat, I poked and prodded and ended up with my very own music."

In October 2013, the Jesus Lizard was set to play at the All Tomorrow's Parties event Release the Bats in Melbourne, Australia. They cancelled this show due to 'unforeseen circumstances'.

Second reunion (2017–present)
In September 2017, the band announced their second reunion. The band undertook their first tour in eight years that December.  They went on a tour in September 2018 and would play Riot Fest 2018 in Chicago that same month.

Sound, influence, and legacy
Their music featured a scathing mix of piercing guitar, machine-like drums, propulsive bass guitar, and psychotic vocals.  Denison's stinging guitar often served more as texture or coloring than as a rhythm or lead instrument, while the rhythm section's stops and starts were simultaneously precise and brutal. David Sprague suggests that "Yow's disjointed couplets" are reminiscent of a "preacher speaking in tongues." Denison cited in his primary influences, british guitarists such as John McGeoch from Siouxsie and the Banshees and Magazine, Andy Gill from Gang of Four, Geordie Walker from Killing Joke, Keith Levene from Public Image Ltd, and bands of the US underground scenes like Black Flag, Hüsker Dü, Butthole Surfers and Big Black. Denison said that he wanted to mix "the post-punk, minimalist thing with the more, ... esoteric, porgy vibe." Albini typically kept vocals "low in the mix," or much less prominent than was typical of rock and roll recordings. In Our Band Could Be Your Life, Michael Azerrad writes that "on the Jesus Lizard albums Albini recorded, singer David Yow sounds like a kidnap victim trying to howl through the duct tape over his mouth; the effect is horrific." Yow doesn't consider himself a singer in the usual sense, but rather, thinks of himself as a vocal stylist. While appreciated as a unique vocalist, Yow was more often cited for his confrontational antics on-stage, often leaping into the crowd or taking off his clothes. He was also known to lick members of the crowd while climbing all over them and sometimes striking up conversation mid-song.

The band have been cited as an influence or as a favorite by Nirvana, Whores, KEN Mode, Bill Kelliher of Mastodon, Botch, Converge, Brand New, Gouge Away, METZ, Steve Albini, Alexis S.F. Marshall of Daughters, Sara Lund of Unwound, Jim Suptic of The Get Up Kids, Jawbreaker, Johnny Temple of Girls Against Boys, Wes Borland of Limp Bizkit, Red Fang, Joe Lally of Fugazi, Henry Rollins, Helmet, Lydia Lunch and many others.

Members
Current
David Yow – vocals (1987–1999, 2008–2010, 2017–present)
Duane Denison – guitar (1987–1999, 2008–2010, 2017–present)
David Wm. Sims – bass (1987–1999, 2008–2010, 2017–present)
Mac McNeilly – drums (1989–1996, 2008–2010, 2017–present)

Former
Jim Kimball – drums (1996–1998)
Brendan Murphy – drums (1998–1999)

Timeline

Discography
Studio albums
Head (1990, Touch and Go)
Goat (1991, Touch and Go)
Liar (1992, Touch and Go)
Down (1994, Touch and Go)
Shot (1996, Capitol)
Blue (1998, Capitol)

EPs
Pure (1989, Touch and Go)
Lash (1993, Touch and Go)
The Jesus Lizard (1998, JetSet)

Singles
"Chrome" (1989, Touch and Go)
"Mouth Breather" (1990, Touch and Go)
"Wheelchair Epidemic" (1992, Touch and Go)
"Gladiator" (1992, Touch and Go)
"Gladiator" / "Boilermaker" (1992, Insipid Vinyl)
"(Fly) On (The Wall)" (1993, Touch and Go)
"Puss" / "Oh, The Guilt" (1993, Insipid Vinyl) (split single of "Puss" by the Jesus Lizard and "Oh, the Guilt" by Nirvana) 
"Puss" (1993, Touch and Go)
"Mailman" (1996, Capitol)

Compilations
Bang (2000, Touch and Go)
 Inch (2009, Touch and Go)

Live albums
Show (1994, Collision Arts)
Club (2011, Chunklet)

Singles and Official Videos
Nub (1991)
Gladiator (1992)
Puss (1993)
Destroy Before Reading (1994)

DVDs
The Jesus Lizard - Live (Music Video Distributors 2007)
The Jesus Lizard - Club (Music Video Distributors 2011)

Chart positions
Albums

Singles

References

External links
 The Jesus Lizard's official MySpace page
 Touch & Go Records
 David Yow in Conversation (pre-reformation gigs)

American post-hardcore musical groups
Alternative rock groups from Texas
Musical groups from Chicago
Musical groups established in 1987
Musical groups disestablished in 1999
Touch and Go Records artists
Capitol Records artists
American noise rock music groups
Musical groups disestablished in 2010
Musical groups from Austin, Texas
Musical groups reestablished in 2017
1987 establishments in Texas
Sonic Unyon artists